List of Washington ballot measures may refer to:

 List of Washington (state) ballot measures
 List of Washington, D.C., ballot measures